Alishewanella aestuarii is a Gram-negative bacterium from the genus of Alishewanella which has been isolated from tidal flat sediments from Yeosu in Korea.

References

Bacteria described in 2009
Alteromonadales